Terebratella is a genus of brachiopods belonging to the family Terebratellidae.

The genus has almost cosmopolitan distribution.

Species:

Terebratella crenulata 
Terebratella crofti 
Terebratella dorsata 
Terebratella labradorensis 
Terebratella sanguinea 
Terebratella sookensis 
Terebratella tenuis

References

Brachiopod genera
Terebratulida